There are at least 34 named lakes and reservoirs in Union County, Arkansas.

Lakes
Babb Lake, el.  
Beaver Pond, el.  
Benjamin Lake, el.  
Blue Lake, el.  
Bolding Lake, el.  
Clear Lake, el.  
Eagle Lake, el.  
Fish Lake, el.  
Fishtrap Lake, el.  
Grand Marais, el.  
Hoop Lake, el.  
Jones Lake, el.  
Little Lake, el.  
 Nickey Lake, el.  
 Open Brake, el.  
 Shaw Brake, el.  
Spice Pond, el.  
 Stow Lake, el.

Reservoirs
Anthony Lake, el.  
Arkansas Noname 55 Reservoir, el.  
Arkansas Noname 56 Reservoir, el.  
Burns Pond, el.  
Calion Lake, el.  
Cooks Pond, el.  
Forty Acre Millpond, el.  
Harper Reservoir, el.  
Harris Lake, el.  
Lake Lisbon, el.  
Lake Wingfield Number Three, el.  
Lake Wingfield Number Two, el.  
Lewis Lake, el.  
Sowell Lake, el.  
Twenty Acre Millpond, el.  
 Wingfield Lake, el.

See also
 List of lakes in Arkansas

Notes

Union